world world world is Japanese alternative rock band Orange Range's eleventh major album.

Track listing

the map
FACTORY
KIMAGURE 23

White Blood Ball Red Blood Ball ~Dub Mix~
Son of the Sun

HIBISCUS

IKAROS
Fin.

References

2009 albums
Orange Range albums